Vahnan (also Romanized as Vahnān and Vehnān) is a village in Simineh Rud Rural District, in the Central District of Bahar County, Hamadan Province, Iran. At the 2006 census, its population was 1,363, in 299 families.

References 

Populated places in Bahar County